Motu Tane (which in Tahitian translates as Man's Island), is a  private island in the lagoon of Bora Bora in French Polynesia.
It is the located between Paahi, and Pitoraverahi.

History
Motu Tane is well known in Bora Bora as having been Paul-Emile Victor's home. Paul-Emile Victor was the famous French polar explorer and author and chose as his personal paradise refuge Motu Tane in Bora Bora, to live a peaceful and secluded life.

The island has coconut groves, encircled by a white sand beach with, just beyond, Polynesia's sparkling turquoise blue waters. 
In 1997, it was purchased by François Nars, artistic director of the well-known cosmetic brand that he founded which carries his name.
As of 2020, it is for sale.

Administration
The island is part of Bora Bora Commune.

Tourism
The island is up for sale

Transportation

After arriving in Fa'a'ā International Airport, an Air Tahiti inter-island flight (50 minutes) will bring you to Bora Bora Airport.

There, you will need to hire a boat at the Rent-a-boat Office.

References

External links

 
French Polynesia
French Polynesian culture
Geography of French Polynesia
History of French Polynesia
Private islands of French Polynesia